Rock & Roll Music to the World is the seventh studio album by the English blues rock band Ten Years After, released in 1972.  It includes several Ten Years After standards, including "Standing at the Station", "Choo Choo Mama", and the title track.

Track listing
All songs written by Alvin Lee.

"You Give Me Loving" – 6:33
"Convention Prevention" – 4:23
"Turned-Off TV Blues" – 5:13
"Standing at the Station" – 7:11
"You Can't Win Them All" – 4:06
"Religion" – 5:49
"Choo Choo Mama" – 4:02
"Tomorrow I'll Be Out of Town" – 4:29
"Rock & Roll Music to the World" – 3:47

Personnel
Ten Years After
Alvin Lee – guitar, vocals
Leo Lyons – bass
Ric Lee – drums
Chick Churchill – organ, piano, synthesizer
Technical
Chris Kimsey - engineer

References

External links 
 

1972 albums
Ten Years After albums
Chrysalis Records albums
Columbia Records albums
Albums recorded at Olympic Sound Studios